Champagne Beach may refer to:

 Champagne Beach (Vanuatu)
 Champagne Beach (Dominica)
 Champagne Beach (Fiji), in the Yasawa Islands